For the Defense is a 1930 pre-Code crime drama film starring William Powell as a lawyer whose ethics are challenged when the woman he loves hits and kills a pedestrian while out driving with another suitor.

Plot 
In New York City, William Foster (William Powell) is a criminal defense attorney so successful that prosecutors regard him as a menace. He holds himself to high ethical standards but is willing to mislead without actually lying.

Foster defends a man who planned a murder using explosives. District Attorney Stone (William B. Davidson) displays a vial and says chemical tests have shown that the liquid in it is sensitive nitroglycerin. Foster sniffs the liquid, questions him to verify the chain of custody, and then smashes the vial dramatically on the floor. When order is restored, he explains to the judge that he knew it was safe because nitro has a distinctive smell, and Stone says he had removed the actual nitro for safety after the chemical test. But Foster points out that only the liquid now in the bottle was entered into evidence, and wins his case.

Foster is in love with actress Irene Manners (Kay Francis), and she loves him, but she wants to be married and he does not. When another suitor, Jack Defoe (Scott Kolk), proposes to her, she says she needs to tell Foster about him before she can accept; but she finds she cannot do so. She stays out late enough at night with Defoe to leave only one implication of what they were doing, and while driving him home, she does agree to marry him. He suddenly hugs her and she loses control of the car, killing a bystander.

To protect Irene's reputation, Defoe urges her to leave the scene, lying that the victim is not badly hurt. Presumed to have been driving while drunk, he is charged with manslaughter. They both still conceal her involvement, but she begs Foster to defend him. He asks why she cares enough about Defoe to insist; she says she and Defoe are just friends, but she had already promised him on Foster's behalf, assuming Foster would be willing. Foster agrees, but finds that Defoe cannot tell a credible story at trial.

Then Foster finds out that Irene was at the accident scene and therefore must be much more than "just friends" with Defoe. Foster is crushed, but she still begs him to get Defoe acquitted, while Defoe fears Foster will throw the case and Irene will be charged and convicted as well. Foster eventually puts his love for Irene first and, for the first time in his life, bribes a juror to vote not guilty, hanging the jury.

Foster is quickly found out and arrested, and defends himself at trial. As he will not see Irene, she goes to Stone, admits what really happened at the accident, and says Foster was only trying to protect her. If Stone does not agree to recommend mercy, Irene says, she will tell her story in court. Stone says he will think about it.

Although his defense is going well, Foster then offers to plead guilty (and thus be disbarred, no doubt making life easier for prosecutors in future) if only Stone will agree not to retry Defoe; but Stone says he does not make deals. Back in court, Irene sends Foster a note pleading to let her testify and tell the truth. To protect her, Foster immediately changes his plea to guilty. Stone then tells Foster that neither Defoe nor Irene will be prosecuted.

As Foster arrives at Sing Sing to serve his sentence, Irene is there and says she will be waiting for him when he comes out. He says that if she does, then he will marry her.

Cast 
 William Powell as William Foster
 Kay Francis as Irene Manners
 Scott Kolk as Jack Defoe
 William B. Davidson as District Attorney Stone
 John Elliott as McGann
 Thomas E. Jackson as Daly
 Harry Walker as Miller
 James Finlayson as Parrott
 Charles West as Joe
 Bertram Marburgh as Judge Evans
 George 'Gabby' Hayes as Ben - Waiter
 John Cromwell as Second Reporter at Trial (uncredited)

References

External links 
 
 
 
 

American romantic drama films
American black-and-white films
American courtroom films
Films directed by John Cromwell
Films set in New York City
1930 romantic drama films
1930 films
1930s English-language films
1930s American films